General John Campbell, 4th Earl of Loudoun (5 May 1705 – 27 April 1782) was a Scottish nobleman and British army officer.

Early career
Born in Scotland two years before the creation of the Kingdom of Great Britain, in which his father Hugh Campbell, 3rd Earl of Loudoun was a significant figure, Campbell inherited his father's estates and peerages in 1731, becoming Lord Loudoun. 

He raised a regiment of infantry that took part in the Jacobite Rising of 1745 on the side of the Hanoverian government. The regiment consisted of twelve companies, with Loudoun as colonel and John Campbell (later 5th Duke of Argyll) as lieutenant-colonel. The regiment served in several different parts of Scotland; three of the twelve companies, raised in the south, were captured at Prestonpans. 

Eight companies, under the personal command of Lord Loudoun, were stationed in Inverness. Loudoun set out in February 1746 with this portion of his regiment and several of the Independent Companies in an attempt to capture the Jacobite pretender, Charles Edward Stuart. The expedition was met by a ruse de guerre (by only four Jacobites) which suggested a large force protected Stuart, and they returned without engagement.  

This was later publicised as the Rout of Moy. After this, Loudoun fell back to join the Duke of Cumberland's army, giving up the town of Inverness to the rebels. Following the battle at Culloden, Loudoun led his mixed force of regulars, militia and highlanders in "mopping up" operations against the remaining rebels

Seven Years War

North America
In 1756, Loudoun was sent to North America as Commander-in-Chief and Governor General of Virginia, where he was unpopular with many of the colonial leaders. When he learned that some merchants were still trading with the French, while he was trying to fight a war against them, he temporarily closed all American ports.  Despite his unpopularity the county of Loudoun, formed from Fairfax in 1757, was named in his honour. 

As Commander-in-Chief during the Seven Years' War (called the French and Indian War in the Thirteen Colonies), he planned an expedition to seize Louisbourg from the French in 1757 but called it off when intelligence (possibly including a French military deception) indicated that the French forces there were too strong for him to defeat. While Loudoun was thus engaged in Canada, French forces captured Fort William Henry from the British, and Loudoun was replaced by James Abercrombie and returned to London. Francis Parkman, a 19th-century historian of the Seven Years' War, rates his martial conduct of the affair poorly.

Many historians debate whether he played a fundamental part in the Seven Years' War. Arguably, he was an influential figure as he embarked on reforms for the army such as replacing the ordinary musket with the flintlock musket for greater accuracy. He made improvements by embarking on a road improvement programme, recognising the need to supply the army as he replaced the traditional supply line with army wagons. His focus was centralising the system of supplies and had built storehouses in Halifax and Albany, whilst recognising the importance of waterways as a means of transport. Most notably, he integrated regular troops with local militias-and the irregulars were to fight a different kind of war, than the linear, European style of warfare in which the British had previously been trained.

Benjamin Franklin's anecdotes of Lord Loudon
Benjamin Franklin provides several first-hand anecdotes of Loudon's North American days in his Autobiography, none complimentary. The following are excerpts:

Portugal

In 1762, he was sent to Portugal to counter the Spanish invasion of Portugal as second-in-command, and he became overall commander in 1763. Despite being unable to prevent the loss of Almeida, the British forces soon launched a counter-attack that drove the invaders back across the border.

Later years

Back in Scotland, in 1763 Loudoun was made Governor of Edinburgh Castle, a post he held for the rest of his life.

In 1770 he was promoted to full general.

Loudoun's interest in horticulture led to his estate being renown for its landscaping. He collected willow species in particular from around the globe.

On 23 January 1773, the town of Loudon, New Hampshire was incorporated and named in Campbell's honor. Loudonville, New York was also named after him as well as the then unincorporated town of Loudon, Massachusetts which was renamed to Otis upon incorporation.

Campbell remained a bachelor, and on his death in 1782 was succeeded as earl by his cousin, James Mure-Campbell.

See also
Loudoun
Fort Loudoun (Tennessee)
Loudonville, New York
Loudon, New Hampshire
Loudoun County, Virginia

References

External links

John Campbell, 4th Earl of Loudoun at wetpaint.com

1705 births
1782 deaths
Earls of Loudoun
British Army personnel of the French and Indian War
British Army generals
Colonial governors of Virginia
British Army personnel of the Jacobite rising of 1745
Loudoun County, Virginia
British Army personnel of the Seven Years' War
Fellows of the Royal Society
Scottish representative peers
Freemasons of the Premier Grand Lodge of England
Grand Masters of the Premier Grand Lodge of England